A men's interest channel generally refers to either a television station, network or specialty channel that targets men as its main demographic; offering programs that appeal to the male population.

There are two types of male interest channels: general interest and niche interest.

General interest
General interest men's channels are television channels that contain programming from diverse genres and categories that will appeal to the male population including films, lifestyle series, dramatic series, reality series, talk shows and more on varying topics including but unlimited to cooking, travel, cars, sex, sports and more.

Examples of general interest male channels
 5Spike (UK, rebranded by Channel 5 to take on the Paramount-owned Paramount Network name)
 7mate (Australia)
 10 Bold (Australia)-owned by Paramount
 Bravo (UK, defunct)
 Cine Mo! (Philippines)
 DMAX (EMEA)-owned by WBD
 EGO (Israel)
 Grit (United States)-owned by Scripps
 Heroes & Icons (United States)
 ITV4 (UK)
 Jack City (Philippines, defunct)
 MAVTV (United States)
 Maxxx (Philippines, defunct)
 Mega (Spain)
 Nitro (Germany)
 Nitro (Spain, defunct)
 Nova Action (Czech Republic)
 Spike (United States, rebranded with the Paramount-owned Paramount Network name)
 Tuff TV (United States, defunct)
 XtvN (South Korea, defunct)
 Markíza Dajto (Slovakia)
 :1 (Slovakia)
 DR1 (Denmark)
 Armenia 2 (Armenia)
 His TV (Hong Kong)

Niche interest
Niche interest men's channels are television channels that contain programming with a specific television genre including film channels, sports channels, adult channels and more.

Examples of men's interest niche channels
 Adult Swim - formerly Showcase Action (Canada)
 Balls (Philippines, defunct)
 Basketball TV (Philippines, defunct)
 Esquire Network (United States, defunct)
 Favorit TV (Romania)
 History2 - formerly MenTV (Canada) 
 Men & Motors (UK)
 Movies4Men (UK & Ireland, became Sony Movies Action)
 Much - formerly MuchMusic (Canada)
 NBA Premium TV (Philippines, defunct)
 NBA TV (United States)
 NBA TV Canada (Canada)
 NBA TV Philippines (Philippines)
 Nuts TV (UK, defunct)
 OLN (Canada)
 Playboy TV (United States)
 Polsat Play (Poland)
 Prima Cool (Czech Republic)
 Pro X (Romania)
 RTL Spike (Hungary, defunct)

References

Interest channel